The Cole Culture (800–1300 CE) is a Late Woodland Period culture of Native American people from central Ohio.

Cole Culture people made flint tools and pottery. They were agrarian and cultivated beans, maize, squash, and tobacco. Cole people buried their dead in subterranean graves instead of mounds. They shared many traits with the Hopewell tradition and might be descended from them.  A major Cole Culture site is the Ufferman Site in Delaware County, Ohio. Another is the Highbank Park Works, also in Delaware County, built between 800 and 1300 CE.

See also
 Carl Potter Mound
 Fort Ancient culture
 Monongahela culture

Notes

References
Owen, Lorrie K., ed. Dictionary of Ohio Historic Places.  St. Clair Shores, Michigan: Somerset Publishers, 1999. .

Archaeological sites in Ohio
Delaware County, Ohio
Woodland period
Prehistoric cultures in Ohio
8th-century establishments in North America
13th-century disestablishments in North America